Ten ships of the Royal Navy have been named HMS Beaver, after the animal, the beaver:

, a ketch in the Royalist navy, captured by Parliamentary forces in 1656 and broken up two years later.
, 18, a sloop originally called Trudaine and operating as a French privateer, but captured in 1757 and renamed before being sold in 1761.
, 14, a sloop launched in 1761 and sold in 1783. 
, 14, a sloop launched in 1795 and sold in 1808.
, 10, a  launched in 1809 and sold in 1829
, a wooden paddle packet originally operating as a Post Office vessel but transferred to the Royal Navy in 1837. It became a dockyard lighter in 1845.
, an  launched in 1855 and broken up in 1864. This vessel was built hastily of unseasoned wood with the result that she was unsound and saw no service at all.
, a 125-ton tender transferred from the War Department to the Royal Navy in 1905 and sold in 1911.
, an  launched in 1911 and sold in 1921.
, a Type 22, or Broadsword-class frigate launched in 1982 and scrapped in 2001.

Battle honours
Louisburg 1758
Athalante 1804
Heligoland 1914
Atlantic 1942

See also
HMS Beavers Prize (or Beaver Prize), was the 24-gun Pennsylvania State privateer Oliver Cromwell, which  captured 12 June 1777. She was commissioned into the Royal Navy shortly thereafter. She was wrecked in 1780, with the loss of many of her crew, in the harbour at St Lucia in a storm. 
Other ships named Beaver

Citations and references
Citations

References

Royal Navy ship names